The 28th World Science Fiction Convention (Worldcon), also known as Heicon '70, was held on 20–24 August 1970 at the Stadthalle Heidelberg in Heidelberg, West Germany.

Manfred Kage eventually became Heicon's convention chairman, the last of more than a dozen fans who briefly held the position during the convention's rocky organizational period.

Participants 

Attendance was approximately 620.

Guests of Honor 

 E. C. Tubb (UK) (pro)
 Robert Silverberg (US) (pro)
 Herbert W. Franke (Germany) (pro)
 Elliot K. Shorter (fan), the 1970 TAFF winner
 John Brunner (toastmaster)

Awards

1970 Hugo Awards 

 Best Novel: The Left Hand of Darkness by Ursula K. Le Guin
 Best Novella: "Ship of Shadows" by Fritz Leiber
 Best Short Story: "Time Considered as a Helix of Semi-Precious Stones" by Samuel R. Delany
 Best Dramatic Presentation: News coverage of Apollo XI
 Best Professional Magazine: Fantasy & Science Fiction Best Professional Artist: Frank Kelly Freas
 Best Fanzine: Science Fiction Review'', edited by Richard E. Geis
 Best Fan Writer: Bob Tucker
 Best Fan Artist: Tim Kirk

See also 

 Hugo Award
 Science fiction
 Speculative fiction
 World Science Fiction Society
 Worldcon

References

External links 

 NESFA.org: The Long List
 NESFA.org: 1970 convention notes 
 Hugo.org: 1970 Hugo Awards

1970 conferences
1970 in Germany
Conventions in Germany
Science fiction conventions in Europe
Worldcon